Pang Mapha is the northernmost district (amphoe) of Mae Hong Son province, northern Thailand.

Etymology
In the Shan language, mapha or makpha (มะผ้า or หมากผ้า) means 'lime' and pang means 'hill', so a rough translation into English might be 'lime hill'.

History
Several prehistoric sites are known within the Pang Mapha area. The most famous one is the Spirit Cave, discovered by Chester Gorman in the mid-1960s, was occupied from about 9000 till 5500 BCE by Hoabinhian hunters and gatherers. Two other significant sites nearby are the Banyan Valley Cave and the Steep Cliff Cave. Much more recent are the coffin caves like Tham Lot.

During World War II Japanese troops built a road from Pai to Mueang Mae Hong Son and further to Burma. Later people used the road for transport, using Ban Soppong Mae Umong (บ้านสบป่องแม่อูมอง) as the overnight stop. The government built a police station in 1948 in the area called Pang Mapha. In 1977 the government improved the road, many people from other districts and provinces, hill tribes and refugees from Myanmar moved to the area. This created problems like drug trafficking and deforestation. To improve the administration of the area, the government created the Pang Mapha minor district (king amphoe) on 1 April 1987, by splitting the two tambons Sop Pong and Pang Mapha from Mueang Mae Hong Son district. It was upgraded to a full district on 5 December 1996.

Geography
The Daen Lao Range dominates the landscape of this district. Neighboring districts are (from southeast clockwise): Pai, Mueang Mae Hong Son of Mae Hong Son Province and Shan State of Myanmar.

The main river of the district is the Khong River.

Tham Lot cave is in Tham Lot District.

Administration
The district is divided into four sub-districts (tambons), which are further subdivided into 38 villages (mubans). There are no municipal (thesaban) areas. There are four tambon administrative organizations (TAO).

References

External links
amphoe.com
 https://web.archive.org/web/20070310200805/http://cddweb.cdd.go.th/pangmapha/ (Thai)
Photo Gallery from the Telegraph (UK)
 

Pangmapha